John Wheeler House may refer to:

 Jonathan Wheeler House, Canterbury, Connecticut, listed on the National Register of Historic Places (NRHP)
 John R. Wheeler Jr. House, Dunlap, Iowa, listed on the NRHP in Harrison County, Iowa
John Wheeler House (Murfreesboro, North Carolina), listed on the NRHP in Hertford County, North Carolina
John Wheeler House (Berea, Ohio), listed on the NRHP in Cuyahoga County, Ohio

See also
Wheeler House (disambiguation)
 John Wheeler (disambiguation)